Deep Water Bay Beach is a gazetted beach next to Deep Water Bay located to the south of Shouson Hill, Southern District, Hong Kong and is one of the four Hong Kong beaches which remain open during the non-bathing season. The beach has barbecue pits and is managed by the Leisure and Cultural Services Department of the Hong Kong Government. The beach is 400 metres long and is rated as Grade 1 by the Environmental Protection Department for its water quality.

Usage
The beach is less known to tourists than the adjacent Repulse Bay and is nonetheless very popular among local people. Seaview Promenade, on the east side of Deep Water Bay, connects it with Repulse Bay, the path allows joggers and walkers alike to exercise alongside the seashore while admiring the stunning sea view, while Mills & Chung Path connects Deep Water Bay with Wong Chuk Hang on the west side.

Features
The beach has the following features:
 BBQ pits (35 nos.)
 Changing rooms
 Showers
 Toilets
 Fast food kiosk
 Water sports centre
 Fee-charging car park

See also
 Beaches of Hong Kong

References

External links 

 Official website

Southern District, Hong Kong
Beaches of Hong Kong